Rust v. Sullivan, 500 U.S. 173 (1991), was a case in the United States Supreme Court that upheld Department of Health and Human Services regulations prohibiting employees in federally funded family-planning facilities from counseling a patient on abortion. The department had removed all family planning programs that involving abortions. Physicians and clinics challenged this decision within the Supreme Court, arguing that the First Amendment was violated due to the implementation of this new policy.  The Supreme Court, by a 5–4 verdict, allowed the regulation to go into effect, holding that the regulation was a reasonable interpretation of the Public Health Service Act, and that the First Amendment is not violated when the government merely chooses to "fund one activity to the exclusion of another."

Background 
The case concerned the legality and constitutionality of Department of Health and Human Services regulations on the use of funds spent by the U.S. federal government to promote family planning (Title X). With Title X of the Public Health Service Act, Congress prohibited the funds from being "used in programs where abortion is a method of family planning." In 1988, the Republican-appointed Secretary of Health and Human Services issued new regulations that prohibited projects receiving these funds from not only providing abortions, but also counseling, advising, or promoting the idea that a woman seek an abortion. These regulations were challenged on the grounds that they were not permissibly within the scope of the statute and that they violated the First and Fifth Amendments. In Rust v. Sullivan (1991), the petitioners stated that they had experienced an infringement of their First Amendment constitutional rights, as grantees of federal funds for family-planning services under Title X of the Public Health Service Act (the "Act"). Under Section 1008 of the Act, the grantees are prohibited from using any of the funds for family-planning services related to abortion. Further compliance by the Act requires the grantees to provide written policies to their sub-recipients on the prohibition of the funds for any abortion-related services. Planned Parenthood and the state and city of New York sued on the grounds that not receiving government funding meant that abortions in turn would not be funded.

Rust v. Sullivan began on the issue of abortion counseling. In February 1988, the Reagan administration added regulations that focused specifically on discussing abortion practices. Planned Parenthood and the state and city of New York said that these regulations infringed on doctors’ First Amendment rights, interfered with a woman's privacy right when it comes to abortion, and prevented a woman from being able to hear competent and sound medical advice. Arguers protested that if a facility receives government funding, it does not mean that the government can regulate the services in that facility. For example, a library that receives funds through the Library Services and Construction Act does not permit the Federal Government to say that the books in that library can or cannot have certain books. Additionally, universities that receive Federal funds do not have their curriculum dictated by the Federal Government.

Opinion of the Court 
Chief Justice Rehnquist wrote the majority opinion, which was joined by Justices White, Scalia, Kennedy, and Souter. The court ruled that "a doctor employed by the project may be prohibited in the course of his project duties from counseling abortion or referring for abortion. This is not a case of the government suppressing a dangerous idea, but of a prohibition on a project grantee or its employees from engaging in activities outside of its scope." The court found that "Title X of the Public Health Service Act of 1970 may be read to bar not only abortions but also abortion counseling." Rehnquist wrote for the majority in finding that the regulations were based upon a permissible interpretation of the statute under the Chevron test, that they did not violate First Amendment free speech rights, and that they did not violate the right of women to terminate a pregnancy as established in Roe v. Wade under the Fifth Amendment substantive due process doctrine.

In the dissenting opinion, Justice Blackmun said "the Court for the first time upholds viewpoint-based suppression of speech, solely because it is imposed on those dependent upon the government for economic support. I conclude that the Secretary’s regulation of referral, advocacy and counseling activities exceeds his statutory authority, and also that the regulations violate the First and Fifth Amendments of our Constitution." Justices Marshall, Stevens, and O’Connor joined Blackmun's dissenting opinion. Stevens wrote separately that "not a word in the statute...authorizes the (HHS) Secretary to impose any restrictions on the dissemination of truthful information or professional advice by grant recipients."

Reasoning 
Section 1008 of the Public Health Service Act specified that none of the federal funds appropriated under the Act's Title X for family-planning services "shall be used in programs where abortion is a method of family planning." In 1988, respondent Secretary of Health and Human Services issued new regulations requiring, inter alia, that recipients of the federal funding 
(1) not engage in any counseling regarding abortion as a method for family planning; and
(2) maintain an objective integrity and independence from abortion activities by the use of separate facilities, personnel, and accounting records.

The Court held that the regulations were a permissible construction of the statute and consistent with the First and Fifth Amendments.

(1) The regulations were a permissible construction of Title X. The regulations did not violate the First Amendment free-speech rights of private Title X fund recipients, their staffs, or their patients by impermissibly imposing viewpoint-discriminatory conditions on government subsidies. Section 1008's abortion prohibition was constitutional because the government might make a value judgment favoring childbirth over abortion and implement that judgment by using subsidies of public funds. Maher v. Roe, 432 U.S. 464, 474 (1977). The use of public subsidies by the government was not rendered “discrimination” simply by the government's favoring one viewpoint over another.

(2) The Secretary's construction of Title X must be accorded substantial deference by this Court because: (a) HHS was the agency charged with administering Title X, and (b) the Court could not look to § 1008 of Title X for interpretation. Section 1008 was ambiguous because it did not speak directly to abortion issues regarding counseling, and did not provide any guidance as to what was meant by “program integrity”. Moreover, the title neither defined § 1008's "method of family planning" phrase, nor enumerated what types of medical and counseling services were entitled to funding. The Secretary's construction of § 1008 would not be disturbed since (a) it was a plausible construction of the statute's plain language, (b) it did not conflict with Congress' expressed intent, and (c) the legislative history either was ambiguous as to Congress' intent on those issues or supported the Secretary's interpretation. The legislative history demonstrated that Congress had intended that Title X funds be kept separate and distinct from abortion-related activities. An agency must be given ample latitude to adapt its rules to changing circumstances. Thus, an interpretation that was different from previous interpretations deserved deference if it complimented the changes in circumstances. The Secretary's change of interpretation was amply supported by a "reasoned analysis" as the new regulations were more in keeping with Title X's original intent, which was supported by the testimony of client experience under the prior policy.

(3) The Doctors' argument, that if the Government chooses to subsidize one viewpoint over a subject (here, abortion), then it must also balance that viewpoint by subsidizing its opposite, had clearly been rejected by the Court. Comparing, e.g., Regan v. Taxation with Representation of Washington, 461 U.S. 540 (1983). The regulations do not force the Title X grantee, or its employees, to give up abortion-related speech; they merely require that such activities be kept separate and distinct from the activities of the Title X project. F.C.C. v. League of Women Voters of California, 468 U.S. 364, 400 (1984); Regan, 461 U.S. at 546, distinguished.

(4) Although it could be argued that the traditional doctor-patient relationship should enjoy First Amendment protection from government regulation, even when subsidized by the government (comparing, e.g., United States v. Kokinda, 497 U.S. 720, 726 (1990)), that question need not be resolved, since the Title X program's regulations did not significantly impinge on the doctor-patient relationship.

(5) The regulations did not violate a woman's Fifth Amendment right to choose whether to terminate her pregnancy. The government had no constitutional duty to subsidize an activity merely because it was constitutionally protected, and might validly choose to allocate public funds for medical services relating to childbirth but not to abortion. Webster v. Reproductive Health Services, 492 U.S. 490, 510 (1989). Such allocation placed no governmental obstacle in the path of a woman wishing to terminate her pregnancy, and left her with the same choices as if the Government had chosen not to fund family planning services at all. See Harris v. McRae (1980). Nor did the regulations place restrictions on the patient/doctor dialogue which violated a woman's right to make an informed and voluntary choice under City of Akron v. Akron Center for Reproductive Health (1983) and Thornburgh v. American College of Obstetricians and Gynecologists (1986). A doctor's ability to provide abortion-related information and a woman's right to receive such information remained unfettered outside the context of the Title X project.

Implications
The court's ruling was much broader than just abortion and family planning services; if the government pays for a program, it can attach substantive restrictions on speech by employees of the program. Thus federal funds for family planning programs could promote only childbirth options without violating the Constitution. Other views regarding abortion services could not be admitted within Title X's narrowly defined scope.

Clinics
Several family planning clinics challenged the Rust v. Sullivan regulations and requested declaratory judgements before the rules went into effect so that the clinics would not have to choose between receiving government funding or freedom of speech. Many clinics would find it economically unrealistic to separate their family-planning facilities from those for abortion services, and, therefore, would have to eliminate one part of their program. Title X projects now must be deemed “physically and financially separate” from facilities that do provide abortion counseling or services. Title X Projects can not provide counseling that deals with abortion as a method of family planning, provide referrals for abortion as a method of family planning, advocate abortion in any manner (including lobbying for its legalization or taking legal action to make abortion more accessible), or provide public speakers who promote abortion as a method of family planning.

Aftermath
Women and health organizations tried to force Congress to pass legislation that would overturn the regulations on abortions. An amendment to Title X was passed by Congress that said all pregnancy counseling, including family planning with abortion services, should be allowed at a government funded clinic when a pregnant patient wants it. However, President Bush vetoed this bill. The House narrowly failed to override the veto, so the bill failed.

The Bush administration decided to modify the regulations anyway. Among other things, the changes would have made it so that physicians could refer patients for abortions if it would prevent serious medical harm to the patient. However, the Bush administration did not follow proper administrative procedures that are required for issuing new regulations. As a result, Bush's changes was declared void by the Court of Appeals for the D.C. Circuit. Before any new policy could be made, Arkansas governor Bill Clinton was elected to be the next President of the United States. Clinton promised during his campaign that his administration would eliminate the rule. President Bush did not try to reenact these policies between November and his last days as President of the United States in January 1993. The Rust v. Sullivan precedent stands as the current precedent on federal government leeway in utilizing funding policy to restrict the discussion of disfavored topics.

Historical significance
Beginning over abortion rights and women's privacy rights, Rust v. Sullivan was a challenge to whether or not the government could regulate services provided in government funded facilities. Although the regulations were repealed, the Rust v. Sullivan decision remains a powerful defense of government restrictions on speech.

See also
 List of United States Supreme Court cases, volume 500
 List of United States Supreme Court cases
 Lists of United States Supreme Court cases by volume
 List of United States Supreme Court cases by the Rehnquist Court

Further reading

References

External links
 

United States Supreme Court cases
United States abortion case law
United States administrative case law
United States Free Speech Clause case law
1991 in United States case law
American Civil Liberties Union litigation
United States Supreme Court cases of the Rehnquist Court